The Swiss national under-18 football team is the national under-18 football team of Switzerland controlled by Swiss Football Association.

Recent results

Swiss national teams
 Switzerland national football team
 Switzerland national under-23 football team (also known as Swiss Olympic)
 Switzerland national under-21 football team
 Switzerland national under-20 football team
 Switzerland national under-19 football team
 Switzerland national under-17 football team
 Switzerland national under-16 football team

External links
 U18 National Team

European national under-18 association football teams
F